The Florida Baptist Convention (FBC) is a group of churches affiliated with the Southern Baptist Convention located in the U.S. state of Florida. Headquartered in Jacksonville, Florida, the convention is made up of 49 Baptist associations and around 2,900 churches as of 2010.
The FBC is currently led by Dr. John Thomas "Tommy" Green III when he was named the Executive Director-Treasurer of the Florida Baptist Convention as of May 31, 2015.
The FBC was formed on November 20, 1854 by a convention of seventeen delegates representing some 55 congregations meeting in Madison, Florida, in the home of R. J. Mays, who was elected president. At the time, there were three associations: Florida, West Florida and Alachua.

Affiliated organizations 
Blue Springs Baptist Conference Center
Florida Baptist Foundation
Florida Baptist Children's Homes
Florida Baptist Credit Union
Florida Baptist Retirement Centers, Inc
Florida Baptist Witness - State Baptist Newspaper
Florida Baptist Historical Society
Lake Yale Baptist Conference Center
South Florida Urban Impact Center

Affiliated education institutions
Baptist College of Florida
Stetson University (1885-1907, 1919-1995)
Columbia College, Lake City, Florida, 1907-1919

External links
Florida Baptist Convention

References

Baptist Christianity in Florida
Conventions associated with the Southern Baptist Convention
Religious organizations established in 1854
Baptist denominations established in the 19th century
1854 establishments in Florida